Ali Lohrasbiis an Iranian singer and pop-star.

Early life 
Ali Lohrasbi is from Tehran. He was born on April 9, 1976. He is the first child in his family and has 3 younger brothers. He was a Quran reader in his childhood. Correct reading of Quran helped him to learn many termolos. He studied electronics at Islamic Azad University, Karaj Branch. After he was accepted to university, he began to learn piano. Lohrasbi started writing songs for children.

Career 
Performing the theme song of White Cottage series was his first official activity in pop music.

After 2 years, he released his first album published Daryaeeha. Lohrasbi's next album Mosalas was released in 2006. One of its songs is "Biraheha".  He performed many concerts, mostly in Kish and Tehran. His concert at Saadabad palace was held on September 9 and 10, 2007 with audiences of more than 5000 each night. His other albums were 14, Tasmim and Robat. Some of the big songs of these albums are "Kooh", "Delnavazan", "Harfaye Nagofte", "Ghalbam", "Shor Shore Baroon" and "Delhore".

Discography
From sea (2003) (دریایی ها)
Triangle (2006) (مثلّث)
14 (2009) (۱۴)
Decision (2011) (تصمیم)
Robot (2014) (ربات)

References

External links
 
 Ali Lohrasbi on Spotify

1976 births
Living people
Singers from Tehran
Iranian pop singers
Iranian male singers
Persian-language singers
21st-century male singers
Iranian singer-songwriters
21st-century Iranian male singers